Patrick Osoinik (born January 29, 1985) is an Austrian professional association football player currently playing for SV Horn. He plays as a defender and won eleven caps for the Austria national under-21 football team.

External links

1985 births
Living people
Austrian footballers
Association football defenders
Austrian Football Bundesliga players
FC Admira Wacker Mödling players
Kapfenberger SV players
First Vienna FC players
Footballers from Vienna